Petr Rada (born 21 August 1958) is a Czech football coach and former player. He represented Czechoslovakia internationally in the 1980s and managed the Czech Republic national football team between 2008 and 2009. He is well known for his arguments with fans or trainer colleagues and also for impulsive style of coaching.

Before being named national team manager in July 2008, Rada worked as an assistant for then national team coach Karel Brückner from 2006 to 2008, and also as an assistant to Jozef Chovanec from 1998 to 2001 when Chovanec was manager of the Czech national team. Rada has also been head manager of eight various Czech clubs: FK Teplice (on four separate occasions), FC Viktoria Plzeň, FK Jablonec, FC Slovan Liberec, SK Slavia Prague, FC Vysočina Jihlava, Příbram and Sparta Prague.

Playing career
In his playing days, Rada was a defender, who starred for Dukla Prague for nine years, from 1979 to 1988. He won the Czechoslovak First League with them in 1979 and 1982. Rada also made eleven appearances for his national team, Czechoslovakia.

Management career
Rada joined Jablonec as manager in October 2003 and led the team to the final of the 2006–07 Czech Cup, where they lost against Sparta Prague. After nearly four years at the club, Rada decided to leave the club in 2007.

On 8 April 2009, he was sacked as coach of the Czech Republic national team after the team won just two of their six qualification matches for the 2010 FIFA World Cup.

He returned to coaching on 26 October 2010 as the new coach of FC Slovan Liberec. In June 2011, it was announced he was returning to coach FK Teplice for his third spell.

Rada became manager of Slavia Prague in 2012. He left Slavia in April 2013 with the club in eighth place in the league, with five matches of the season remaining.

Personal life
Rada is the father of goalkeeper Filip Rada.

Honours

Managerial
 FK Jablonec
Czech Cup runner-up:  2017–18

Managerial statistics

References

External links
 
 

1958 births
Living people
Czech footballers
Czechoslovak footballers
Association football midfielders
Czechoslovakia international footballers
Dukla Prague footballers
Fortuna Düsseldorf players
Rot-Weiss Essen players
FK Chmel Blšany players
SSV Jahn Regensburg players
Czech football managers
Czech First League managers
SK Slavia Prague managers
FK Teplice managers
FC Viktoria Plzeň managers
FK Jablonec managers
FC Slovan Liberec managers
Czech Republic national football team managers
1. FK Příbram managers
Bundesliga players
2. Bundesliga players
Czechoslovak expatriate footballers
Expatriate soccer players in Canada
Czechoslovak expatriate sportspeople in Canada
Czechoslovak expatriate sportspeople in West Germany
Czech expatriate sportspeople in Germany
AC Sparta Prague managers
Footballers from Prague
FK Dukla Prague managers
Czech National Football League managers
Expatriate footballers in West Germany
Expatriate footballers in Germany